Umzumbe is a seaside resort situated at the mouth of the Mzumbe River (bad kraal) in KwaZulu-Natal, South Africa. The name of the river is derived from a band of Hlongwa cannibals who occupied the valley. The Hlongwa was almost wiped out by the Zulu king Shaka in 1828.

Etymology
Umzumbe is situated south of the mouth of the Mzumbe River, from which it takes its name; of Zulu origin, it has been explained as meaning ‘the dangerous river’, ‘the winding river’ and ‘wild bean river’. The form uMzumbe has been approved.

Geography

It lies on the R102 to Hibberdene and Durban to the north and Port Shepstone to the south.

Recreational areas
Umzumbe has one beach, the Umzumbe Beach which is a Blue Flag Beach. Nearby and larger beaches within the Lower South Coast include Hibberdene, Ramsgate, St Michael's-on-Sea, Uvongo, Margate and Marina Beach.

Another recreational area is the Umzumbe Surf Camp.

Spearfishing
Spearfishing is popular in Umzumbe as the Umzumbe point is the most prominent tip south of Hibberdene. It is a prime area for garrick and brusher.

References

Populated places in the Ray Nkonyeni Local Municipality